The 2009–10 Premier Reserve League (officially known as the 2009–10 Barclays Premier Reserve League for sponsorship reasons) was the eleventh season since the establishment of the Premier Reserve League. The season began on 24 August 2009 and ended with the play-off final being hosted by the Northern League champions on 3 May 2010 (The venue for the final alternates between the Northern & Southern champions).

The events in the senior leagues during the 2008–09 season saw Middlesbrough, Newcastle United and West Bromwich Albion all relegated and replaced by the promoted teams Burnley, Wolverhampton Wanderers, and Birmingham City. Tottenham Hotspur will not be entering a team for this season.

On 12 April 2010, in a behind closed doors fixture at their Bodymoor Heath training ground, Aston Villa beat Fulham 2-1 with goals from Barry Bannan and Ciaran Clark to book their place in the playoff final with 2 league games to spare.

On 20 April, Liverpool lost 1-0  at home to Everton.  This was their 4th defeat in a row and it handed the Premier Reserve League North title to Manchester United.

The playoff final went to a penalty shoot out where Manchester United beat Aston Villa 3-2.  Goalkeeper, Ben Foster scoring the decisive penalty kick.  The match had finished 3-3 in normal time.

Tables

Premier Reserve League North
Final table as of 4 May 2010

Premier Reserve League South
Final table as of 27 April 2010

Rules for classification: 1st points; 2nd goal difference; 3rd goals scoredPos = Position; Pld = Matches played; W = Matches won; D = Matches drawn; L = Matches lost; F = Goals for; A = Goals against; GD = Goal difference; Pts = Points; C = Champions

Play-off Final

Results

Premier Reserve League North

Premier Reserve League South

Top scorers

Premier Reserve League North

Premier Reserve League South

Promotion and relegation
Teams relegated from the Premier Reserve League at the end of this season:
 Hull City
 Burnley
 Portsmouth
Teams promoted to the Premier Reserve League next season:
 Newcastle United
 West Bromwich Albion
 Blackpool

See also 
2009–10 Premier Academy League
2009–10 FA Youth Cup
2009–10 Premier League
2009–10 in English football

References

External links 
 Current league tables  (North)  (South)
 Fixtures and results  (North)  (South)

Match reports 

Match reports can be found at each club's official website:

2009-10 Premier Reserve League
2009–10 in English football leagues
Reserve